These are the official results of the Women's 3.000 metres event at the 1991 IAAF World Championships in Tokyo, Japan. There were a total number of 40 participating athletes, with three qualifying heats and the final held on Monday August 26, 1991.

Medalists

Schedule
All times are Japan Standard Time (UTC+9)

Final

Qualifying heats
Held on Saturday 1991-08-24

See also
 1987 Women's World Championships 3.000 metres (Rome)
 1988 Women's Olympic 3.000 metres (Seoul)
 1990 Women's European Championships 3.000 metres (Split)
 1992 Women's Olympic 3.000 metres (Barcelona)
 1993 Women's World Championships 3.000 metres (Stuttgart)

References
 Results

 
1991 in women's athletics